Whakaki  is a settlement east of Wairoa within the Wairoa District and Hawke's Bay Region of New Zealand's North Island.  runs through it.

Whakakī Lake, southwest of the settlement, is the largest freshwater lagoon on the east coast of the North Island.

Whakakī is a Māori word meaning "to fill".

Demographics

Whakaki had a population of 675 at the 2018 New Zealand census, an increase of 3 people (0.4%) since the 2013 census, and a decrease of 51 people (−7.0%) since the 2006 census. There were 255 households, comprising 354 males and 321 females, giving a sex ratio of 1.1 males per female. The median age was 44.8 years (compared with 37.4 years nationally), with 135 people (20.0%) aged under 15 years, 102 (15.1%) aged 15 to 29, 315 (46.7%) aged 30 to 64, and 117 (17.3%) aged 65 or older.

Ethnicities were 41.3% European/Pākehā, 71.6% Māori, 0.4% Pacific peoples, 1.3% Asian, and 0.9% other ethnicities. People may identify with more than one ethnicity.

The percentage of people born overseas was 4.4, compared with 27.1% nationally.

Although some people chose not to answer the census's question about religious affiliation, 31.1% had no religion, 43.6% were Christian, 16.4% had Māori religious beliefs, 0.4% were Muslim, and 0.4% were Buddhist.

Of those at least 15 years old, 54 (10.0%) people had a bachelor's or higher degree, and 150 (27.8%) people had no formal qualifications. The median income was $24,000, compared with $31,800 nationally. 48 people (8.9%) earned over $70,000 compared to 17.2% nationally. The employment status of those at least 15 was that 240 (44.4%) people were employed full-time, 78 (14.4%) were part-time, and 39 (7.2%) were unemployed.

Marae
Whakakī is a marae (meeting place) and wharenui (meeting house) for the Ngāi Te Ipu hapu (subtribe) of Ngāti Kahungunu iwi.(tribe).

Education
Whakaki Native School was established in 1912. It was damaged in the 1931 Hawke's Bay earthquake and (as Whakaki Maori School) celebrated its golden jubilee in 1962. but no longer exists.

References

Wairoa District
Populated places in the Hawke's Bay Region
Populated places around Hawke Bay